Muskets is an English rock band formed in Brighton, East Sussex, England in 2014, by Alex Cheung, Daniel Mckenna, Dan Smith and Joe Philips. They have released two EP's, 'Pollyseed' in 2014 and 'SPIN' in 2015. Their debut album 'CHEW' was released via No Sleep Records in 2017. Mckenna left the band in late 2017 and was replaced by Harry Steel of the band Rain. Smith therefore moved to guitar and Steel opted to play bass for the group.

Discography

Albums

EPs

Singles 
 "You're So Cool" (2017)

Musical style
Muskets have cited influences such as Surfer Rosa-era Pixies, Bleach-era Nirvana and '90s post-hardcore acts such as Fugazi and At the Drive-In, leading to them being described as emo, grunge, alternative rock, shoegaze, post-punk, post-hardcore and punk rock.

Members

Current line-up
Alex Cheung - guitar, vocals (2014–present)
Dan Smith - guitar, vocals (2017–present), bass (2014-2017)
Harry Steel - bass (2017–present)
Joe Phillips - drums (2014–present)

Former members
 Daniel Mckenna - guitar, vocals (2014-2017)

References

British emo musical groups
Grunge musical groups
British alternative rock groups
Post-hardcore groups
Musical groups from Brighton and Hove
No Sleep Records artists